Durell Eskridge (born December 17, 1991) is an American football free safety for the Toronto Argonauts of the Canadian Football League (CFL). He played college football at Syracuse University. Eskridge signed with the New York Jets as an undrafted free agent in 2015.

Early years
Eskridge attended Miami Central High School where he helped the football team to the 2010 6A State Championship with a record of 12-1. He was ranked 2nd among the national rankings for both wide receiver and safety in his senior season.

Professional career

New York Jets
On May 2, 2015, Eskridge signed with the New York Jets following the conclusion of the 2015 NFL Draft.

Arizona Cardinals
The Arizona Cardinals signed Eskridge to their practice squad on October 14, 2015. Then later was moved to active roster December 22, 2015. On January 26, 2016, Eskridge signed a futures contract with the Arizona Cardinals.

On August 15, 2016, Eskridge was waived/injured by the Cardinals and was placed on injured reserve. He was released from injured reserve on October 24, 2016.

Toronto Argonauts
On May 11, 2017, Eskridge signed with the Toronto Argonauts of the Canadian Football League.

References

External links
Syracuse bio
New York Jets bio

Living people
American football safeties
New York Jets players
Arizona Cardinals players
1991 births